The 2021 Liga 3 West Kalimantan will be the sixth season of Liga 3 West Kalimantan as a qualifying round for the national round of the 2021–22 Liga 3.

Persikat Ketapang were the defending champion.

Teams
There are 10 teams participated in the league this season, divided into 2 groups of five.

Group stage

Group A

Group B

Knockout stage

Semi final
Leg 1

Leg 2

Gabsis Sambas won 2–1 on aggregate.

Final
Leg 1

Leg 2

Gabsis Sambas won 4–3 on penalty shoot-out.

References

Liga 3